This is a list of the songs that reached number one in Mexico in 2010, according to Monitor Latino.

Monitor Latino's chart rankings are based on airplay across radio states in Mexico utilizing the Radio Tracking Data, LLC in real time. Charts are ranked from Monday to Sunday. Besides the General chart, Monitor Latino published "Pop", "Regional Mexican" and "Anglo" charts.

Chart history

General
In 2010, nine songs reached number one on the General chart; all of these songs were entirely in Spanish. Four acts achieved their first number-one song in Mexico: Camila, Enrique Iglesias, Juan Luis Guerra and Marco Antonio Solís.

"Mientes" by Camila and "Cuando me enamoro" by Enrique Iglesias & Juan Luis Guerra were the longest-running General number-ones of the year, both staying at the top position for thirteen consecutive weeks each. "Cuando me enamoro" was also the best-performing song of the year.

Pop

Regional

English

See also
List of number-one albums of 2010 (Mexico)
List of top 20 songs for 2010 in Mexico

References

2010
Number-one songs
Mexico